Karothi Venkata Satyanarayana, better known as K. V. Satyanarayana is a Kuchipudi dancer, choreographer, dance director and composer in India. He has established Sri Satya Kuchipudi and Janapada Nritya Akademy and trained many artists. He won the Nandi Award for Best Choreographer for Sruthilayalu (1987)

Brief profile
He was born to Venkata Ramanamma and Guruvulu as Karothi Venkata Satyanarayana at Eluru While in the college days studying B. Com. he was inspired by Korada Narasimha Rao and started acting in different roles. He was trained under famous Kuchipudi dancer Vempati Chinna Satyam.

Choreographer for films

 Sruthilayalu (1987)
 Swarnakamalam (1988)
 Sutradharulu (1989)
 Swathi Kiranam (1992)

Awards
 Kala Ratna by Government of Andhra Pradesh in 2009.
 Bharata Muni Award (1990)
 Nandi Award for Best Choreographer for Shruthilayalu in 1987.
 Pratibha Puraskaram by Potti Sriramulu Telugu University (2013)

References

Nandi Award winners
Kuchipudi exponents
Dance teachers
1957 births
Living people